Kelsey Cliff is a prominent cliff standing close southeast of Mount Owen in the eastern end of the Guettard Range, in Palmer Land, Antarctica. It was first mapped by the Ronne Antarctic Research Expedition – Falkland Islands Dependencies Survey joint sledge party in 1947–48, and was named for Lawrence D. Kelsey, a radio operator with the Ronne expedition.

References

Cliffs of Palmer Land